The 2017 Ebrahim Raisi presidential campaign began when Ebrahim Raisi, chairman of the Astan Quds Razavi, launched his  campaign for the 2017 presidential election. Raisi's campaign pursued a populist agenda.

Early stages 
In February 2017, Ebrahim Raisi was said to be backed by the Front of Islamic Revolution Stability and emerging as the conservative camp consensus candidate. One of  the  senior member of the front told press that his party tried to “persuade Ebrahim Raisi to stand for   the elections, but did not succeed”. On 23 February 2017, Raisi won the majority of votes during the meeting held by Popular Front of Islamic Revolution Forces, a newly established umbrella organization of conservatives.

50 out of the 88 members of the Assembly of Experts, whose names has not been disclosed, have signed a letter supporting Raisi for president in March 2017.

Branding 
 
It focuses on presenting him as a symbol of Mohammad Beheshti, Iran's chief justice assassinated in 1981. His campaign portrays him as "man of the people"; when Mashhad was hit by an earthquake in early April, he cancelled his meeting in Tehran and said “it is necessary to be with the religious people of this land”.

Raisi has publicized pictures of his visits to poverty-stricken areas in remote villages, and opening an apartment complex for the families of Afghan fighters killed in Syrian civil war.

On 17 April 2017, Raisi wrote an open letter to Hassan Rouhani, recommending him to “observe moral codes”. Raisi's campaign symbol is "National identity card".
On 15 May 2017, conservative candidate Mohammad Bagher Ghalibaf withdrew his candidacy in favor of Raisi. It is speculation that Ghalibaf will be Raisi's first vice president if he gets  elected. They also joined in a campaign rally in Tehran with each other.

Media coverage 
Iranian moderates and reformists have criticized Iran's state-run television, Islamic Republic of Iran Broadcasting (IRIB), for "excessively reporting" on Raisi. According to Etemaad newspaper, the television has been showing Raisi as the prayer Imam regularly in recent days. Raisi however wrote an open letter to IRIB head Abdulali Ali-Asgari, claiming it has 'biased advertisements' toward Rouhani because of coverage of his speeches as the President of Iran.

Social media activity 
In March 2017, a determined campaign began in social media with circulating pictures of mostly young people, including liberal-looking women loosely wearing a hijab, holding pictures with the hashtag #RaisiCome.

TV programs

Political positions

Economics

Raisi has said “I see the activation of a resistance economy as the only way to end poverty and deprivation in the country”. He supports development of the agricultural sector, rather than spending money on shopping malls, which “will eventually benefit foreign brands”. Raisi sees economic sanctions as an opportunity.

He has promised to triple the monthly state benefits, currently Rls.450,000 per citizen, to tackle corruption and create six million jobs.

Foreign policy
Answering reporters about his foreign policy, he said it “would be to establish ties with every country except Israel”.

Sex segregation
Ebrahim Raisi is one of the supporters of Sex segregation. He said in a 2014 interview that "I think this is a good move because the majority of women do a better job in a totally relaxed atmosphere and fit are required", said about a plan segregation in Tehran Municipality. He is also supporter of Islamization of universities, revision of the Internet and deal with Western culture.

Provincial visits

Endorsements

Organizations 
 Union of Islamic Student Societies
Front of Islamic Revolution Stability
Resistance Front of Islamic Iran
Front of Followers of the Line of the Imam and the Leader
YEKTA Front
Combatant Clergy Association
Society of Seminary Teachers of Qom
Islamic Society of Engineers
Ansar-e-Hezbollah
 Islamic Labours' Welfare Party
 National Reconciliation and Islamic Progress Party
 Popular Staff for Serving Nation
 Justiceseekers Party of Islamic Iran

Individuals 
Mohammad-Bagher Ghalibaf, withdrew candidate
Assembly of Experts members
 Ahmad Alamolhoda
 Mohammad-Taqi Mesbah-Yazdi (former)
MPs
 Mohammad Mehdi Zahedi
 Javad Karimi-Ghodousi
 Nader Ghazipour
 Alireza Zakani (former)
 Mehrdad Bazrpash (former)
 Bijan Nobaveh-Vatan (former)
Former ministers
 Mohammad Abbasi
 Ali Nikzad
 Masoud Mir-Kazemi
 Marzieh Vahid-Dastjerdi
 Mohammad Soleimani
 Alireza Marandi
Former vice presidents
 Masoud Zaribafan
 Fereydoon Abbasi
Former vice ministers
 Saeed Jalili
 Ezzatollah Zarghami
Judiciary officials
 Saeed Mortazavi (former)
 Javad Larijani
Artists
 Masoud Dehnamaki
 Amir Tataloo
Athletes
 Kioumars Hashemi
Others
 Alireza Panahian
 Hassan Abbasi

International figures 

 Avi Perry, former intelligence expert for the Israeli government

 Elliott Abrams, former U.S. Republican diplomat

Controversy 
Raisi's practice of distributing flour among the poor has been criticized and compared to Mahmoud Ahmadinejad's similar distribution of potatoes before 2009 presidential election.

References

External links

2017 Iranian presidential election
Election campaigns in Iran
Populism in Iran
Campaign